The 1983–84 Bundesliga was the 21st season of the Bundesliga, the premier football league in West Germany. It began on 12 August 1983 and ended on 26 May 1984. Stuttgart won the championship. Defending champions, Hamburg finished second. The 1983–84 Bundesliga season holds the record for most goals scored in a Bundesliga season.

Competition modus
Every team played two games against each other team, one at home and one away. Teams received two points for a win and one point for a draw. If two or more teams were tied on points, places were determined by goal difference and, if still tied, by goals scored. The team with the most points were crowned champions while the two teams with the fewest points were relegated to 2. Bundesliga. The third-to-last team had to compete in a two-legged relegation/promotion play-off against the third-placed team from 2. Bundesliga.

Team changes to 1982–83
Karlsruher SC and Hertha BSC were directly relegated to the 2. Bundesliga after finishing in the last two places. They were replaced by SV Waldhof Mannheim and Kickers Offenbach. Karlsruhe and Hertha BSC were eventually joined in demotion by relegation/promotion play-off participant FC Schalke 04, who lost on aggregate against Bayer 05 Uerdingen.

Season overview

On the 32nd game day of the season 53 goals were scored in 9 games, marking the highest number of goals ever scored in a single game day of the Bundesliga. The 1983–84 season is also the season in which the most goals of the course of the whole season were scored, 1084 in total.

Team overview

 Waldhof Mannheim played their matches in nearby Ludwigshafen because their own ground did not fulfil Bundesliga requirements.

League table

Results

Relegation play-offs
Eintracht Frankfurt and third-placed 2. Bundesliga team MSV Duisburg had to compete in a two-legged relegation/promotion play-off. Frankfurt won 6–1 on aggregate and remained in the Bundesliga.

Top goalscorers
26 goals
  Karl-Heinz Rummenigge (FC Bayern Munich)

20 goals
  Klaus Allofs (1. FC Köln)

19 goals
  Frank Mill (Borussia Mönchengladbach)

18 goals
  Christian Schreier (VfL Bochum)
  Rudi Völler (SV Werder Bremen)

17 goals
  Pierre Littbarski (1. FC Köln)

16 goals
  Fritz Walter (SV Waldhof Mannheim)

15 goals
  Thomas Allofs (1. FC Kaiserslautern)
  Friedhelm Funkel (Bayer 05 Uerdingen)
  Dieter Schatzschneider (Hamburger SV)
  Herbert Waas (Bayer 04 Leverkusen)

Champion squad

See also
 1983–84 2. Bundesliga
 1983–84 DFB-Pokal

References

External links
 DFB Bundesliga archive 1983/1984

Bundesliga seasons
1
Germany